Weakened Friends is an American indie rock band formed in Portland, Maine, signed to Big Scary Monsters and best known for their 2018 song "Blue Again", from their debut full-length album Common Blah. The band consists of Sonia Sturino (vocals, guitar), Annie Hoffman (bass, vocals), and Adam Hand (drums).

In 2021, the band announced their second full-length album, Quitter, released on November 19.

Members
Current Members
 Sonia Sturino - vocals, guitar (2015–present)
 Annie Hoffman - bass, vocals (2015–present)
 Adam Hand - drums (2019–present)
Past Members
 Cam Jones - drums (2015-2019)

Discography
Studio Albums

 Common Blah (2018, Don Giovanni)
 Quitter (2021, Don Giovanni)

Extended Plays
 Gloomy Tunes (2015, self-released)
 Crushed (2016, Counter Intuitive Records)
 on Audiotree Live (2018, Audiotree)
Singles
 "What You Like" (2019, Don Giovanni)

References

External links
 
 

Musical groups from Portland, Maine
Don Giovanni Records artists